Super Ape is a dub studio album produced and engineered by Lee "Scratch" Perry, credited to his studio band The Upsetters.

In Jamaica, the album was released under the name Scratch the Super Ape in July 1976 on Perry's own Upsetter label. The Jamaican version had a different track order than the international version that was released in August the same year on Island Records.

The album was listed in the 1999 book The Rough Guide: Reggae: 100 Essential CDs.

Super Ape was reissued on November 29, 2013 as Record Store Day Black Friday double vinyl release with three extra tracks: "Rastaman Shuffle", "Magic Touch" and "Corn Fish Dub".  Side 4 featured an etching of the Super Ape album cover art.

Track listing
All tracks composed by Lee "Scratch" Perry

Side one
"Zion's Blood"
"Croaking Lizard"
"Black Vest"
"Underground"
"Curly Dub"

Side two
"Dread Lion"
"Three in One"
"Patience"
"Dub Along"
"Super Ape"

Personnel
Lee Perry – producer, percussion, conga
Michael "Mikey Boo" Richards – drums
Anthony "Benbow" Creary – drums
Noel "Skully" Simms – conga
Boris Gardiner – bass
Earl "Chinna" Smith – guitar
Keith Sterling – piano
Bobby Ellis – horns
"Dirty" Harry Hall – horns
Herman Marquis – horns
Vin Gordon – trombone
Egbert Evans – flute
Prince Jazzbo – toasting on "Croaking Lizard"
Barry Llewellyn – backing vocals
Earl Morgan – backing vocals
Tony Wright – cover art

References

The Upsetters albums
1976 albums
Albums produced by Lee "Scratch" Perry
Dub albums
Island Records albums